The Theological Review: A Quarterly Journal of Religious Thought was an English Unitarian theological journal that ran from 1864 to 1879. It was edited by Charles Beard and published by Williams and Norgate.

Publications established in 1864
Publications disestablished in 1879
Unitarianism in the United Kingdom
Religious studies journals
Quarterly journals
English-language journals